Satellite refuelling is the operation of replenishing on board propellants and other consumables in satellites in orbit, e.g. in geostationary orbit around Earth.

This could be for storable propellants, and later for cryogenic propellants.

Examples :
 Space Infrastructure Servicing by Canadian MDA
 Orbital Express — a 2007 U.S. government-sponsored mission to test in-space satellite servicing with two vehicles designed from the start for on-orbit refueling and subsystem replacement.
 Robotic Refueling Mission, a series of NASA projects, including cryogenics transfer tests at ISS

Contracts :
 Jan 2022: Astroscale contracted to use Orbit Fab in-orbit propellant depots.

Standards 
 Rapidly Attachable Fluid Transfer Interface, for non-cryogenic fluids and gases
 ASSIST, for docking, ground tested by a consortium of European companies.

Alternatives 
Rather than refuel, another craft could attach itself to the customer satellite and provide any desired propulsion. E.g.:
 Mission Extension Vehicle, of Northrop Grumman, MEV-1 in operation in 2021.

References 

Satellites